The Rapidly Increased Firepower Capability Royal Netherlands Navy, also known as the TRIFIC-program, was announced on 23 November 2022 by Captain at sea Paul Flos, head of maritime systems at DMO. These ships are planned to be acquired in the short term.

History 
On 23 November 2022 it was revealed that the navy is investigating the possibility of purchasing four commercially available offshore supply type vessels and use these ships as missile carriers. This program was dubbed The Rapidly Increased Firepower Capability Royal Netherlands Navy (TRIFIC) and would become a low-manned ships, with the eventual goal of having a fully autonomous vessel. The TRIFIC-vessels can carry up to six container units with eight or more vertical launch cells (depending on missile size) in each container. One or more of these ships would accompany another vessel like a frigate or an OPV and use the guiding systems and radars of these ships to attack targets.

Design 
The TRIFIC ships will be designed to stay close (around ) to a mother ship and give extra missile capability. The ship will rely on the radars, missile guidance and defence from an external source like the Future Air Defender,  or the ASW frigate acting as mother ship.

Stage 1 
The first stage of the TRIFIC-program is to develop a ship with a low crew. Crew is required on these ships to keep a man-in-the-loop to actually fire the missiles.

Stage 2 
In stage two it is planned for the ships to sail themselves, with a minimal crew to keep a man-in-the-loop.

Stage 3 
In stage three the ships will be fully autonomous accompanying the mother ships.

Armament

Missiles 
DMO has spoken to several countries, including Israel, America and France to supply an array of missiles in the short term. The type of missiles is not limited to Surface-to-air or cruise missiles. Also the possibility to equip the ships with loitering munition is being investigated.

Countermeasure 
Being very modular by design it, is also possible to load units with a soft kill capability, for example electronic warfare units.

See also
 Future of the Royal Netherlands Navy
 Future Air Defender
 Large Unmanned Surface Vehicle

Citations 

Royal Netherlands Navy
Missile defense
Missile launchers
Missile operation
Guided missiles
Missiles
Rockets and missiles
Naval weapons
Proposed ships of the Royal Netherlands Navy